Yelloweye may refer to:

The Yellow-eye mullet, a fish in the family Mugilidae
The Yelloweye rockfish, a fish in the family Sebastidae
Coats' disease, an eye disease

See also

Yellow Eyes, a science fiction novel